Skypark Link is a limited express train service in Kuala Lumpur, Malaysia between  (KL Sentral) and Subang Airport. It is Malaysia's second airport rail link service, after the Express Rail Link (KLIA Ekspres and KLIA Transit).

Operated by Keretapi Tanah Melayu (KTM), the service shares the same tracks as the Port Klang Line between KL Sentral and Subang Jaya, however they diverge after Subang Jaya, with one set of tracks heading towards Subang Airport and the other towards Port Klang. Ordinary Port Klang Line trains stops at all stations between KL Sentral and Subang Jaya, while the Skypark Link runs non-stop between them. One new station, the Terminal Skypark station, located opposite Subang Airport, is built to serve the line. Two reserve stations were planned between Subang Jaya and Terminal Skypark, but are currently not constructed.

The line is one of the components of the Klang Valley Integrated Transit System. It is numbered 10 and coloured brown on official transit maps.

Services are currently suspended since 15 February 2023 due to low ridership.

Line information

Route

{
  "type": "ExternalData",
  "service": "geoline",
  "ids": "Q51419215",
  "properties": {
    "stroke": "#c1731f",
    "stroke-width": 6
  }
}

The 26km Skypark Link commenced operations on 1 May 2018 and runs between KL Sentral and Subang Skypark with a stop in Subang Jaya. In contrast to ordinary Port Klang Line services, after leaving Subang Jaya, the Skypark Link skips all stations between Setia Jaya and Abdullah Hukum, both stations inclusive.

The journey time from KL Sentral to Subang Skypark is 30 minutes.

Operations began 1 May 2018 with free rides available until the end of the year. Free rides were only provided for trips that begin or end at Terminal Skypark; no free rides were given for trips between KL Sentral and Subang Jaya only.

Stations
The three stations served by Skypark Link are, from east to west:

Frequency
Services were suspended between March 2020 and October 2021 due to the Coronavirus pandemic. Services were restored on 15 October 2021. Services were suspended again from 15 February 2023 due to low ridership. The current timetable is here.

There were 25 services a day: 12 trips from KL Sentral to the airport, and 13 trips from the airport to KL Sentral.

Rolling stock

The service uses four refurbished KTM Class 83 electric multiple units (EMUs). The original livery, which featured blue and yellow colours associated with ordinary KTM Komuter services, was changed to grey and orange. The trains are expected to accommodate up to 300 passengers at once, and are intended to lighten traffic congestion and serve air passengers and people working at the Skypark terminal.

Background

The Electrified Double Tracking Project consists of two phases: Phase 1 between Subang Jaya and Subang Skypark, which was awarded to Konsortium Skypark Link-Lion Pacific Sdn Bhd, and phase 2 from Subang Skypark, through Kampung Melayu Subang and Ladang Elmina and ending at KTM/MRT Sg. Buloh to allow rail cargo traffic to bypass downtown Kuala Lumpur.. However, unconfirmed reports state that alternative plans, including an extension of the ECRL to Serendah instead of extending the Skypark Link, were being studied.

The construction of the link was funded by the Ministry of Transport to provide rail-based public transport to connect the Sultan Abdul Aziz Shah (SAAS) Airport Terminal 3 (Terminal Skypark) and its vicinity with the existing KTM railway. The RM521 million rail link was commissioned in 2013 with an initial completion date in 2016, but this was later extended to 2018.

The project consists of two main parts: an at-grade section between Subang Jaya and the old Sri Subang spur line for the length of 4.09 km using the existing railway reserve previously funded by Petronas to transport fuel from Port Klang to the airport, and a new section between the new location of Sri Subang for the total length of 4.067 km which is elevated rail track along the existing Sungai Damansara river reserve, ending at the car park just outside Subang Skypark.

Connection with KLIA
Skypark Link interchanges with the Express Rail Link at KL Sentral, thus allowing rail connection between the Subang Airport and KLIA.

See also
KTM Komuter
Seremban Line
Port Klang Line
Skypark Link
 Padang Besar Line
 Padang Rengas Line
Public transport in Kuala Lumpur

References

External links
 Skypark Link Brochure Advertisement

Railway lines opened in 2018
Railway lines in Kuala Lumpur
2018 establishments in Malaysia